Esches is a commune in the Oise department in northern France. Esches station has rail connections to Beauvais and Paris.

See also
 Communes of the Oise department

References

External links

 Esches at CC des Sablons

Communes of Oise